River's Edge is a 1986 American film directed by Tim Hunter.

It may also refer to:

 The River's Edge, a 1957 American film directed by Allan Dwan
 River's Edge (2018 film), a Japanese film directed by Isao Yukisada
 River's Edge, Edmonton, a planned neighbourhood in Alberta, Canada
 River's Edge, a hamlet in Saskatchewan, Canada
 River's Edge, a proposed subway station on the MBTA Orange Line in Massachusetts, United States

See also 
 
 
 River Edge, New Jersey
 Water's Edge (disambiguation)
 Riverside (disambiguation)